Thorns is the debut studio album by Norwegian black metal band Thorns. It was released in 2001, through Moonfog Productions.

The album features guest appearances from Satyr (of Satyricon), Aldrahn (of Dødheimsgard) and Hellhammer (of Mayhem). Stylistically, Thorns is quite different from both Trøndertun and the first Thorns demo, Grymyrk. While it retains the eerie riff structures of those early releases, it displays a strong industrial influence, particularly on tracks like "Shifting Channels" and "Underneath the Universe, Part 1".

Samples 

The samples "Jesus, what a mind-job" and "So, you're here to save the world" in the song "Existence" are taken from the 1999 film The Matrix.

Track listing

Personnel 

 Aldrahn (Bjørn Dencker) – vocals 
 Satyr (Sigurd Wongraven) – vocals, production, mixing, mastering 
 Snorre W. Ruch – guitar, bass guitar, keyboards, programming, vocals on the song "Vortex", production, mixing, mastering
 Hellhammer (Jan Axel Blomberg) – drums

 Production

 Mike Hartung – recording, engineering, mixing, mastering
 Morten Lund – mastering

References

External links 

 

2001 debut albums
Thorns (band) albums
Industrial metal albums